Achnatherum diegoense is a species of grass known by the common name San Diego needlegrass. It is native to southern California, where it is known from San Diego and Ventura Counties and the Channel Islands, and Baja California.

Description
It is a resident of chaparral and coastal sage scrub ecosystems below 350 feet in elevation, especially near streams. This is a bunching perennial grass reaching heights between 110 and 140 centimeters. The inflorescence is up to about 25 centimeters long. The hairy spikelet is about a centimeter long not counting the long awn, which can be up to 5 centimeters long and has two distinct kinks.

References

External links
Jepson Manual Treatment
USDA Plants Profile
Grass Manual Treatment
Photo gallery

diegoense
Bunchgrasses of North America
Grasses of Mexico
Native grasses of California
Flora of Baja California
Flora of California
Flora of the Cascade Range
Flora of the Klamath Mountains
Flora of the Sierra Nevada (United States)
Natural history of the California chaparral and woodlands
Natural history of the California Coast Ranges
Natural history of the Channel Islands of California
Natural history of the Peninsular Ranges
Natural history of the San Francisco Bay Area
Natural history of the Transverse Ranges
Plants described in 1940